Coryphagrion grandis is a species of damselfly found in coastal forests and on the lower slopes of the Eastern Arc Mountains in Kenya, Tanzania and Mozambique. Its monotypic genus Coryphagrion is considered as the only member of the family Coryphagrionidae (sometimes placed in the Megapodagrionidae as subfamily Coryphagrioninae). It was once placed within the family Pseudostigmatidae, whose other members are all Neotropical, but further studies showed this family was paraphyletic.

References

 

Pseudostigmatidae
Insects described in 1924